Kathal is an upcoming Indian Hindi-language social comedy drama film written by Ashok Mishra and directed by Yashowardhan Mishra for Netflix. The film is produced by Shobha Kapoor, Ekta Kapoor, Guneet Monga and Achin Jain under the banners Balaji Motion Pictures and Sikhya Entertainment. The film features Sanya Malhotra, Anant V Joshi, Vijay Raaz, Rajpal Yadav, Brijendra Kala and Neha Saraf in lead roles.

Cast 

 Sanya Malhotra as Mahima
 Anant V Joshi
 Vijay Raaz
 Rajpal Yadav
 Vikram Pratap as Pankaj
 Brijendra Kala
 Neha Saraf
 Govind Pandey
 Aeklavya tomer

Production

Development 
The film was officially announced in March 2022.

Casting

Filming 
The film wrapped up shooting in May 2022.

Marketing 
The official teaser of the film was released by Netflix India YouTube Channel on 24 September 2022.

Release 
The film was scheduled to be released on Netflix.

References

External links 

 

2020s Indian films
Indian direct-to-video films
Upcoming Netflix original films
Hindi-language drama films
Hindi-language comedy films
Hindi-language Netflix original films
Upcoming Hindi-language films
Indian comedy-drama films